Šleževičius Cabinet was the 6th cabinet of Lithuania since 1990. It consisted of the Prime Minister and, initially, 17 government ministers (19 after the Ministry of Government Reforms and Municipalities was established and the Ministry of Culture and Education was split into two).

After the 1993 Lithuanian presidential election, the newly elected President Algirdas Brazauskas appointed Adolfas Šleževičius of the Democratic Labour Party of Lithuania as the Prime Minister on 10 March 1993. The government received its mandate and started its work on 31 March 1993, after the Seimas gave assent to its program.

The government served for almost three years before Šleževičius was dismissed by the parliament on 8 February 1996 in wake of financial scandals. The government continued to serve in an acting capacity (with Laurynas Stankevičius as the acting Prime Minister) until Stankevičius formed a new government that started its work on 19 March 1996.

Cabinet
The following ministers served on the Šleževičius Cabinet.

References 

Cabinet of Lithuania
1993 establishments in Lithuania
1996 disestablishments in Lithuania
Cabinets established in 1993
Cabinets disestablished in 1996